Audio description, also referred to as a video description, described video, or more precisely visual description, is a form of narration used to provide information surrounding key visual elements in a media work (such as a film or television program, or theatrical performance) for the benefit of blind and visually impaired consumers. These narrations are typically placed during natural pauses in the audio, and sometimes during dialogue if deemed necessary. Occasionally when a film briefly has subtitled dialogue for a character speaking a different language in the film such as in the 1977 film, Star Wars: A New Hope with Greedo's confrontation with Han Solo, the narrator will read out the dialogue in character.

In museums or visual art exhibitions, audio described tours (or universally designed tours that include description or the augmentation of existing recorded programs on audio- or videotape), are used to provide access to visitors who are blind or have low vision. Docents or tour guides can be trained to employ audio description in their presentations.

In film and television, description is typically delivered via a secondary audio track. In North America, Second audio program (SAP) is typically used to deliver audio description by television broadcasters. To promote accessibility, some countries (such as Canada and the United States) have implemented requirements for broadcasters to air specific quotas of programming containing audio description.

History

Silent films could naturally be enjoyed by the deaf due to the lack of spoken dialogue or sound whatsoever. The transition to "talkies" in the late 1920s displaced this audience, but resulted in a push to make them accessible to the visually impaired. The New York Times documented the "first talking picture ever shown especially for the blind"—a 1929 screening of Bulldog Drummond attended by members of the New York Association for the Blind and New York League for the Hard of Hearing, which offered a live description for the visually-impaired portion of the audience. In the 1940s and 1950s, Radio Nacional de España aired live audio simulcasts of films from cinemas with descriptions, framing these as a form of radio drama before the advent of television.

In the 1980s, the Media Access Group of U.S. public television station WGBH-TV (which had already gained notability for their involvement in developing closed captioning) developed an implementation of audio description for television programming via second audio program (SAP), which it branded as "Descriptive Video Service" (DVS). It was developed in consultation with Dr. Margaret Pfanstiehl of Washington, D.C., who had performed descriptions at theatrical performances and had run a radio reading service known as the Washington Ear. After four years of development and on-air trials (which included a proof of concept that aired the descriptions on a radio station in simulcast with the television airing), WGBH officially launched audio description via 32 participating PBS member stations, beginning with the new season of American Playhouse on January 24, 1990.

In the 1990s at cinemas in California, RP International began to offer audio descriptions for theatrical films under the brand TheatreVision, relayed via earpieces to those who request it. A clip from Schindler's List was used to pitch the concept to the film's producers Gerald Molen and Branko Lustig, and one of the first films to be presented in this format was Forrest Gump (1994). TheatreVision sought notable personalities and celebrities to volunteer in providing these narrations, such as sportscaster Vin Scully, William Shatner, Monty Hall, and former U.S. president George H. W. Bush (for It's a Wonderful Life). Sometimes the narrator had ties to the film or was part of its cast; Irene Bedard described Pocahontas—a film where she had voiced the title character, and for the 1994 remake of Little Women, stars from previous versions of the film volunteered, including June Allyson, Margaret O'Brien, and Janet Leigh (whose grandmother was blind) from the 1949 version of the film, as well as Katharine Hepburn—star of the 1933 version. Other companies emerged in providing descriptions for programming in the U.S., including the National Captioning Institute, Narrative Television Network, and others.

In the UK Audio Description services were made available on the BBC and ITV after a collaborative project with industry partners. In 2000, the BBC voluntarily committed to providing descriptions for at least 20% of its programming annually. In practice, the BBC has often exceeded these targets. In 2009, BBC iPlayer became the first streaming video on-demand service in the world to support AD where every programme that was broadcast with AD also had AD on BBC iPlayer. On January 29, 2009, The Accessible Channel was launched in Canada, which broadcasts "open" audio descriptions on all programming via the primary audio track. Audio description has also been extended to live events, including sporting events, the ceremonies of the Olympic and Paralympic Games, and the royal wedding of Prince William and Catherine Middleton, among others.

In April 2015, the subscription streaming service Netflix announced that it had added support for audio description, beginning with Daredevil—a series based on a comic book character who himself is blind, and would add descriptions to current and past original series on the platform over time. The following year, as part of a settlement with the American Council of the Blind, Netflix agreed to provide descriptions for its original series within 30 days of their premiere, and add screen reader support and the ability to browse content by availability of descriptions.

On June 17, 2016, Pornhub announced that it would launch a collection of pornographic videos with audio descriptions. The initiative is sponsored by the website's philanthropic arm Pornhub Cares.

In the late-2010s, Procter & Gamble began to add descriptions to some of its television commercials, first in the United Kingdom, and later Spain and the United States.

Legal mandates in television broadcasting

Canada 

Under Canadian Radio-television and Telecommunications Commission (CRTC) rules, broadcast television stations and former Category A services that dedicated more than half of their programming to comedy, drama, or long-form documentary programs, were required to broadcast at least four hours of programming with audio descriptions (known in Canadian English as described video) per-week, with two hours of this "original" to the channel per-week. These programs must have been drawn from children's, comedy, drama, long-form documentaries, general entertainment and human interest, reality, or variety genres. Broadcasters must also promote the availability of DV programming, including airing a standard audiovisual bumper and logo at the beginning of all programs offering description (the CRTC officially recommends that this announcement be repeated after the conclusion of each commercial break, but this is not typically practiced). All television providers are also required to carry AMI-tv (formerly The Accessible Channel), a specialty channel that broadcasts all programming with descriptions on the primary audio track.

On March 26, 2015, the CRTC announced that beginning September 1, 2019, most broadcast and specialty networks owned by vertically integrated conglomerates, as well as any channel previously subject to license conditions specifying minimums for DV, are required to supply described video for any prime-time programming (7:00 p.m. to 11:00 p.m.) that falls within the aforementioned genres. The requirement that a quota of DV programming be "original" to the network was also dropped. Citing the possibility that not enough imported U.S. programming may be supplied with descriptions for their first airing, and the burden this may place on their ability to carry these programs, the CRTC granted an exception to Bell Media, Corus Entertainment, and Rogers Media, along with minor companies DHX Media, CBC, Blue Ant Media, V, and TVA Group, for foreign programming that is received within 24 hours of its scheduled airing—provided that any future airings of the same program in prime-time contain descriptions. In addition, other licensed discretionary services would be expected to air at least four hours of DV programming per-week by the fourth year of their next license term.

United Kingdom 
The Ofcom code on television access services requires broadcasters that have been on the air for at least five years to broadcast at least 10% of their programming with descriptions. Scrutiny has applied even to ESPN UK—a sports channel—which was fined £120,000 by Ofcom for not meeting an AD quota in 2012. The regulator rejected an argument by ESPN that AD was redundant to commentary, as it is "not provided with the needs of the visually impaired in mind".

United States 

Initially, audio description was provided as a public service. However, in 2000, the Federal Communications Commission would enact a policy effective April 1, 2002, requiring the affiliates of the four major television networks in the top 25 markets, and television providers with more than 50,000 subscribers via the top 5 cable networks as determined by Nielsen ratings, to offer 50 hours of programming with descriptions during primetime or children's programming per-quarter. However, the order faced a court challenge led by the MPAA, who questioned the FCC's jurisdiction on the matter. In November 2002, the Court of Appeals for the District of Columbia Circuit ruled that the FCC had no statutory jurisdiction to enforce such a rule.

This was rectified in 2010 with the passing of the Twenty-First Century Communications and Video Accessibility Act, which gave the FCC jurisdiction to enforce video description requirements. The previously intended quotas were reinstated on July 1, 2012, and have been gradually increased to require more programming and wider participation since their implementation.

Operation
Broadcast audio description is typically delivered via an alternate audio track, either as a separate language track containing the narration only (which, if the playback device is capable of doing so, is mixed with the primary audio track automatically, and can have separate volume settings), or on a secondary audio track pre-mixed with the primary track, such as a secondary audio program (SAP).

Many video on demand (VOD) and streaming platforms host separate assets for the audio-described media, with the soundtrack pre-mixed. Despite AD typically being presented as something that can be enabled, as with subtitles, users can encounter problems when trying to turn AD on or off because the underlying media version they require is unavailable.

In movie theaters, audio description can be heard using DVS Theatrical and similar systems (including DTS-CSS and Dolby Screentalk). Users listen to the description on a wireless headset.

In live theaters, patrons also receive the description via a wireless device, a discreet monaural receiver. However, the description is provided live by describers located in a booth acoustically insulated from the audience, but from where they have a good view of the performance. They make their description which is fed to a small radio transmitter.

Audio description in Football (Soccer) stadiums
In 2006, on the occasion of the 2006 FIFA World Cup in Germany, a project was launched with the aim of making the live commentary of a match available to blind and visually impaired football fans in the stadium. The project was very well received and had great success.
In 2008, audio description in football was also adopted in Switzerland. The radio of FC Basel 1893 was the first club in Switzerland to take up this topic. First, FC Basel installed an antenna in St. Jakob Park, which was used to broadcast the radio's live commentary. The visually impaired and blind fans could then listen to the commentary via a VHF frequency. More and more clubs in the Swiss Super League adopted this concept and today the matches can be heard via audio description in every stadium in Switzerland. At St. Jakob-Park in Basel, even without delay via the Internet. In the meantime, the outdated technology of FM transmission has been abolished. Today, the games are broadcast via cell phone apps. In Germany, too, almost every stadium is equipped with this technology.

Descriptive Video Service
The Descriptive Video Service (DVS) is a major United States producer of audio description. DVS often is used to describe the product itself.

In 1985, PBS member television station WGBH-TV in Boston, Massachusetts, began investigating uses for the new technology of stereophonic television broadcasting, particularly multichannel television sound (MTS), which allowed for a third audio channel, called the Secondary Audio Program (SAP). With a history of developing closed captioning of programs for hearing-impaired viewers, WGBH considered the viability of using the new audio channel for narrated descriptions of key visual elements, much like those being done for live theatre in Washington, D.C., by Margaret Pfanstiehl, who had been experimenting with television description as part of her Washington Ear radio reading service.

After reviewing and conducting various studies, which found that blind and visually impaired people were consuming more television than ever but finding the activity problematic (often relying on sighted family and friends to describe for them), WGBH consulted more closely with Pfanstiehl and her husband, Cody, and then conducted its first tests of DVS in Boston in 1986. These tests (broadcasting to local groups of people of various ages and visual impairments) and further study were successful enough to merit a grant from the Corporation for Public Broadcasting to complete plans to establish the DVS organization permanently in 1988. After national testing, more feedback, more development of description technique, and additional grants, DVS became a regular feature of selected PBS programming in 1990. Later, DVS became an available feature in some films and home videos, including DVDs.

Technique
DVS describers watch a program and write a script describing visual elements which are important in understanding what is occurring at the time and the plot as a whole. For example, in the opening credit sequence of the children's series Arthur on PBS, the description has been performed as follows:

The length of descriptions and their placement by a producer into the program are largely dictated by what can fit in natural pauses in dialogue (other producers of description may have other priorities, such as synchronization with the timing of a described element's appearance, which differ from DVS's priority for detail). Once recorded, placed and mixed with a copy of the original soundtrack, the DVS track is then "laid back" to the master tape on a separate audio track (for broadcast on the SAP) or to its own DVS master (for home video). For feature films, the descriptions are not mixed with the soundtrack, but kept separate as part of a DTS soundtrack.

FCC involvement
When the Federal Communications Commission (FCC) started establishing various requirements for broadcasters in larger markets to improve their accessibility to audiences with hearing and vision impairments, DVS branched out to non-PBS programming, and soon description could be heard on the SAP for shows such as CSI: Crime Scene Investigation and The Simpsons. However, a federal court ruled in 2002 that the Federal Communications Commission had exceeded its jurisdiction by requiring broadcasters in the top 25 markets to carry video description.

Since that time, the amount of new DVS television programming in the United States declined, as did access to information regarding upcoming described programming, while broadcasters like ABC and Fox instead decided to devote their SAP channels to Spanish language dubbing tracks of their shows rather than DVS due to the technical limitations of the analog NTSC standard. Description by DVS and other producers was still available in a limited form on television (the greatest percentage of DVS programming is still on PBS). WGBH's Media Access Group continues supporting description of feature films (known as DVS Theatrical) and DVS home videos/DVDs are available from WGBH as well as other vendors and libraries. Commercial caption providers the National Captioning Institute and CaptionMax have also begun to describe programs. Benefit Media, Inc., a subsidiary of DuArt Film and Video in New York City provides DVS services to USA Network. For the 2016 Summer Olympics, NBC is providing description of events during the network's primetime block.

The 21st Century Communications and Video Accessibility Act of 2010 reinstates the FCC's involvement in providing rules for video description. Under the rules, affiliates in the top 25 markets and the top five-rated cable networks will have to provide at least 50 hours of video described programming per quarter; the rules took effect on July 1, 2012. However, this provision currently does not apply to syndicated programming; notably, many programs which have audio description in their network runs, such as those produced by Twentieth Century Fox Television, remove the DVS track for syndication, substituting in the Spanish dubbing track on SAP to reach more viewers, though as many stations affiliated with "netlets" like The CW and MyNetworkTV are not under the video description provision, do not have SAP channels and thus, neither an audio description or Spanish dub track can be heard. In some markets where SAP is activated on affiliate stations though, The CW had provided a Spanish SAP dub for Jane the Virgin through the series' entire run, and audio description is available and passed through for their Saturday morning One Magnificent Morning E/I block, which is done for all of the blocks produced for the major broadcast networks by Litton Entertainment. In 2019, the first primetime series with DVS for the network, In the Dark (which has a blind protagonist), was launched (the series' description propagated to its Netflix run several weeks after it was placed on that service after the first-season finale). MyNetworkTV has no provisions for audio description or language dub tracks, despite many of its scripted series having DVS tracks.

Online streaming services such as Hulu and the services of television networks themselves such as CBS All Access have yet to carry descriptive video service audio in most cases as they instead are currently focused on adding closed captioning to their libraries (the network app for ABC began to carry existing audio described shows in the fall of 2017). Netflix committed in April 2015 to begin audio description of their original series, starting with Daredevil (which features a blind protagonist with other heightened senses) and the remainder of their original programming in the next few months, making their goal in that timeframe, along with providing the DVS tracks of existing series in their library; however some platforms (mainly older versions for devices that are now unsupported) do not provide the alternate audio.

ABC, along with sister network Disney Channel has since added audio description to some of their programming (with a commensurate decline in Spanish-dubbed programming, though the ATSC standard allows more audio channels), but does not contract any of their shows to be described by the Media Access Group, instead going with commercial providers CaptionMax and Audio Eyes. Some special programming such as Toy Story of Terror! and Toy Story That Time Forgot is described by the Media Access Group under existing contracts with Walt Disney Pictures. NBC and their associated cable networks, along with outside productions by Universal Television such as Brooklyn Nine-Nine and The Mindy Project, solely use CaptionMax for description services; Netflix also utilizes CaptionMax for their original series, while going per studio for acquired programming. Most scripted programming on Fox, except for the shows of Gordon Ramsay (Hell's Kitchen, Hotel Hell and Kitchen Nightmares) is described by the Media Access Group; Ramsay's programs are contracted by his producing studio to have audio description done by Scottish-born voiceover artist Mhairi Morrison with Descriptive Video Works. Unique to most described shows, Fox's Empire uses actress Adrienne Barbeau for their description. CBS's described shows all use the Media Access Group.

Some shows have lost their DVS during their original network runs due to outside factors or complications. For instance, American Dad! had a two-season interregnum in part of season 12 and all of season 13 without any DVS service during its move from Fox to TBS in late 2014, before it returned in November 2016 for its fourteenth season. The Mindy Project lost DVS at the start of their fourth season upon the move to Hulu, which does not yet provide DVS service. Cartoon Network and their time-share partner Adult Swim began to pass-through DVS for their syndicated content in the last quarter of 2018.

See also 
 Novelization
 Radio drama
 TheatreVision

Citations

General and cited references 
 Cronin, Barry J. Ph.D. and Robertson King, Sharon, MA. "The Development of the Descriptive Video Service", Report for the National Center to Improve Practice. Retrieved on July 30, 2007.
 "The ABC's of DVS", WGBH - Media Access Group. Retrieved on July 30, 2007.
 "Our Inclusive Approach", AudioVision. Retrieved on July 30, 2007.
 DVS FAQ, WGBH - Media Access Group. Retrieved on July 30, 2007.
 "Media Access Guide Volume 3", WGBH - Media Access Group. Retrieved on July 30, 2007.
 "ACB Statement on Video Description" American Council for the Blind Legislative Seminar 2006, February 1, 2006. Retrieved from Audio Description International on July 30, 2007.
 List of PBS series with DVS, August 2007, WGBH - Media Access Group. Retrieved on July 30, 2007.
 Homepage, MoPix. Retrieved on July 30, 2007.
 "DVS Home Video" WGBH - Media Access Group. Retrieved on July 30, 2007.

Further reading
 Hirvonen, Maija: Multimodal Representation and Intermodal Similarity: Cues of Space in the Audio Description of Film. (Ph.D. thesis.) University of Helsinki, 2014. . On-line version.

External links

General
 "Description Key for Educational Media" by The Described and Captioned Media Program
 ACB's Audio Description Project
 Audio Description Associates
 Audio Description for Blind and Visually Impaired
 "Who's Watching? A Profile of the Blind and Visually Impaired Audience for Television and Video"
 List of UK audio described programmes on TV
 List of UK audio described DVDs
 Joe Clark on audio description
 E-Inclusion Research Network
 Media Access Australia: Audio Description
 VocalEyes, UK audio description charity, providing access to the arts for blind and partially sighted people
 Audiodescription-france.org 
 Audio Description Association (Hong Kong)
In the US:
WGBH - Media Access Group - DVS Services
The Audio Description Project
Schedule of USA Audio Described TV Programs, Produced by the American Council of the Blind's Audio Description Project
Metropolitan Washington Ear
Audio tracks of DVS version of Masterpiece Theatre's "Wind In the Willows" (regional restrictions may apply)
Poems written from a transcribed DVS version of Basic Instinct via Triple Canopy (online magazine)

Examples of audio description
 adp.acb.org/samples.html
 www.audiodescribe.com/samples/
 www.artbeyondsight.org/handbook/acs-verbalsamples.shtml
 Description of Neighbours and The Motorman from the National Film Board of Canada (QuickTime)

Assistive technology
Television technology